Fu Style Wudang Fist is a family style of Chinese martial arts encompassing T'ai chi ch'uan, Xing-Yi chuan, Bagua zhang, LiangYi chuan, Baji chuan and Wudang Sword. Fu Style Baguazhang is one of the five styles of baguazhang recognized as orthodox in China. It is the precipice and highest-form of the Fu Style martial arts.

History
Fu Zhen Song (name also translated as Fu Chen Sung) began learning Chen Style Tai Chi at age 16 from the famous Chen Family master, Chen Yan Xi.
Three years later, Fu began learning Baguazhang from Jia Qi Shan (also known as Jia Feng Ming). Fu was one of the first to learn these arts, as the Chen Family had only started teaching their art to outsiders a few decades earlier; Dong Hai Chuan had only revealed Baguazhang a few decades earlier, and only took on a handful of students, one of them being Jia Qi Shan. Although Fu did not receive the formal schooling of his urban countrymen, Fu was very bright, learned
the two arts well, and practiced very hard.

At the age of 26, Fu had become very famous for single-handedly defeating a large mob of bandits, a story that appears in a number of versions.

Fu traveled to Beijing where he met the other great Baguazhang masters of that period. He learned from them and exchanged information about the art. In 1928, three military generals organized the first nationwide martial arts competition in Nanjing. Fu Zhen Song was one of the five judges of the competition. When the generals wanted to test the true skill of the top winner, a young man by the name of Wang, all the judges "nominated" Fu to do the "testing." Fu had no choice but to respect the commands of his seniors and fought with the winner, Wang. According to those present, the battle went on for a long time, and at the end, Fu hit Wang off the stage with one single blow. This was to be one of the three high-profile battles Fu was famous for, the other two being the fight with Li Shu-Wen, an older and established master of Bajiquan, and with a large group of Muslims who practiced Cha Quan back in Fu's home village.

During this time, Fu met, befriended and exchanged information with the top Baguazhang masters of China. He became close friends with Sun Lu-t'ang, and taught him the Baguazhang "mud-walking step (tang ni bu)." Fu studied Yang-style taiji from Yang Cheng Fu, and one day beat him in a match of "push hands." Yang said, "You only won because you switched to Baguazhang." Fu also studied swordsmanship with Li Jing Lin.

Fu Zhen Song and four other winners of the competition were invited to the south to teach their arts. Because of this historic event, they were called, "The Five Northern Tigers." These five men were constantly challenged by martial artists in the south, as the southern martial artists were very proud of their arts and refuted the arts of the north. Fu Zhen Song never lost a fight or a challenge.

Fu Zhen Song moved to Guangzhao in the Guangdong Province, and headed a school there. By this time, Fu had synthesized his own system by learning various family styles of taiji; the differing styles of baguazhang; the Wudang Sword from Song Wei Yi (likely learned from Li Jing Lin, though Fu did study under Song for a time); Xingyiquan and Bajiquan; by emphasizing the most important principles and techniques from each, and by eliminating all of the parts he thought were not valuable or of no substance. Fu's style of Baguazhang would include such methods as the yin and yang palm changes, the famous Dragon Baguazhang, the Si Xiang form, the Liang Yi synthesis of Baguazhang and Taijiquan and his own version of Taijiquan. Many of the names used were likely inspired by the I Ching, and the forms and progressions inspired by both that work and by the martial philosophies of Sun Lu Tang.

Learning Progression
When Fu and the other four invited martial artists arrived in Guangdong, Ta Kung Pao newspaper published an extensive article about the background of Fu and proclaimed that he was at that time the "true inheritor" of the Ba Gua Zhang tradition as handed down by Dong Hai Quan and Cheng Ting Hua. Fu understood the massive gap between Tai Chi Chuan and Ba Gua Zhang; thus, he created an elegant solution for that gap. Fu created a martial arts form he called, "Liang-Yi Chuan," or Harmonized Opposites Boxing. This form would be a vital key to the Fu Style system of learning Ba Gua Zhang, as it is a precursory set of movements and skills required to move from Tai Chi Chuan to Ba Gua Zhang.

In other words, if one wishes to learn Fu Style Ba Gua Zhang, he or she must learn Fu Style Tai Chi Chuan very well; then learn Fu Style Liang-Yi Chuan very well in order to advance to the highest levels where he or she can learn Fu Style Ba Gua Zhang. Many will refute this hierarchy of learning, however, this is the true system of learning Fu Style Wudang Chuan (which is the globally encompassing name for the Fu Style system of Tai Chi Chuan, Liang-Yi Chuan, Ba Gua Zhang, Hsing-I Chuan, Baji Chuan, weapons, applications, and total mastery of "Qi," health and wellness).

Fu Style is characterized by a large number of spinning movements and point strikes. This fighting style can also be used to damage internal organs with precise striking methods.

Fu Style Present Day
The Fu Style Wudang Chuan was carried on by his son Fu Wing Fay, who also created forms for  si-xiang, advanced tai chi and more. Among others, Fu taught Bow Sim Mark. The lineage is now held by his own son Victor Fu Sheng Long in Vancouver, Canada.
Victor Fu has somewhat truncated the style because he feels there is not enough time to learn the entirety of the Fu Style system, and it is more important to develop health and wellness, rather than "hands that can chop a table in two." However, with the incorporated conditioning exercises, 2-person routines and the practice of the Bagua Push Hands form, the martial aspects remain intact. Another branch of the style was established by Fu Zhen Song's student Lin Chao Zhen, who likewise modified the teaching methodology.
Fu Zhen Song's internal student To Yu as well taught Fu Style Wudang Chuan in Honk Hong, and now has many disciples in western countries.

References

Liang Shou-You, Yang Jwing-Ming, Wu Wen-Ching (1994). Baguazhang
Miller, Dan (1992). "The Pa Kua Chang of Fu Chen-Sung". Pa Kua Chang Journal 2 (6).
Kirchhoff, Tommy (December 2004). "Evasive Fu Style Bagua Zhang". Inside Kung-Fu: 74–78.
Fu Yonghui and Lai Zonghong (1998). Fu Style Dragon Form Eight Trigrams Palms. Smiling Tiger Martial Arts.
Lukitsh, Jean (October 1992). "A Wushu Dream Comes True". Inside Kung-Fu 2 (3): 34–39, 76.
Smalheiser, Marvin (April 1996). "Fu Style T'ai Chi and Bagua". T'ai Chi.
Smalheiser, Marvin (June 1996). "The Power of Mind and Energy". T'ai Chi.
Smalheiser, Marvin (December 2000). "The Power of Yin/Yang Changes". T'ai Chi.
Allen, Frank; Tina Chunna Zhang (2007). The Whirling Circles of Ba Gua Zhang: The Art and Legends of the Eight Trigram Palm. Blue Snake Books. pp. 48–51.
Fu, Victor Sheng Long 2004 Fu Style, New and Old

External links 
 Fu style schools worldwide

Chinese baguazhang practitioners
Chinese military personnel of World War II
Chinese swordsmanship
Qing dynasty Taoists
Republic of China Taoists
1953 deaths
1872 births
Chinese tai chi practitioners
Chinese xingyiquan practitioners
Sport in Henan
Baguazhang styles
Neijia